The 2014–15 Eastern Washington Eagles men's basketball team represented Eastern Washington University during the 2014–15 NCAA Division I men's basketball season. The Eagles were led by fourth year head coach Jim Hayford and played their home games at Reese Court. They were members of the Big Sky Conference. They finished the season 26–9, 14–4 in Big Sky play to finish in a share for the regular season Big Sky championship. They defeated Idaho, Sacramento State, and Montana to be champions of the Big Sky tournament. They received an automatic bid to the NCAA tournament where they lost in the second round to Georgetown.

Roster

Schedule
 

|-
!colspan=9 style="background:#a10022; color:#FFFFFF;"| Exhibition

|-
!colspan=9 style="background:#a10022; color:#FFFFFF;"| Regular season

|-
!colspan=9 style="background:#a10022; color:#FFFFFF;"| Big Sky tournament

|-
!colspan=9 style="background:#a10022; color:#FFFFFF;"| NCAA tournament

See also
2014–15 Eastern Washington Eagles women's basketball team

References

Eastern Washington Eagles men's basketball seasons
Eastern Washington
Eastern Washington
Eastern Washington Eagles men's basketball
Eastern Washington Eagles men's basketball